醬 may refer to:
 Jiàng (/), Chinese sauces and pastes
 dòubànjiàng (bean paste)
 hǎixiānjiàng (hoisin sauce)
 jiàngyóu (soy sauce)
 tiánmiànjiàng (sweet bean sauce)
 Jang (/), Korean sauces and pastes
 ganjang (soy sauce) and guk-ganjang (soup soy sauce)
 doenjang (soybean paste)
 gochujang (red chili paste)
 miso (soybean paste)
 shōyu (soy sauce)